Blanca Jaime (born November 3, 1965) is a retired female long-distance runner from Mexico. She represented her native country at the 1988 Summer Olympics in Seoul, South Korea, where she finished in 43rd place in the women's marathon, clocking a total time of 2:43:00.

Achievements

References
sports-reference

1965 births
Living people
Mexican female long-distance runners
Olympic athletes of Mexico
Athletes (track and field) at the 1988 Summer Olympics
20th-century Mexican women